Salina Cruz Airport  is an airport located at Salina Cruz, Oaxaca, Mexico. It handles national air traffic for the city of Salina Cruz. It is also known as Naval Air Station Salina Cruz (Estación Aeronaval de Salina Cruz).

The mayor of the town, Mr. Alfredo Cortés Rito ordered the construction of the airstrip in 1942. The first airplane that landed there was carrying a US military attaché.

Facilities

References

External links
 

Airports in Oaxaca